A guideline execution engine is a computer program which can interpret a clinical guideline represented in a computerized format and perform actions towards the user of an electronic medical record.

A guideline execution engine needs to communicate with a host clinical information system. Virtual Medical Record (vMR) is one possible interface which can be used.

The engine's main function is to manage instances of executed guidelines of individual patients.

Architecture 
The following modules are generally needed for any engine:

 interface to clinical information system
 new guidelines loading module
 guideline interpreter module
 clinical events parser
 alert/recommendations dispatch

Guideline Interchange Format 

The Guideline Interchange Format (GLIF) is a computer representation format for clinical guidelines. Represented guidelines can be executed using a guideline execution engine.

The format has several versions as it has been improved. In 2003 GLIF3 was introduced.

Use of third party workflow engine as a guideline execution engine 
Some commercial electronic health record systems use a workflow engine to execute clinical guidelines. RetroGuide and HealthFlow are examples of such an approach.

See also 
 Arden syntax
 Medical algorithm

References

Further reading 

 (PDF)
 (PDF)

Health informatics
Knowledge representation